Option Zero is a 1997, Hong Kong action film produced by Gordon Chan and John Chong and featuring the directorial debut of Dante Lam. This film is a sequel to 1994's The Final Option and 1996's First Option. Film stars Julian Cheung, Anthony Wong, Carmen Lee, Monica Chan and guest stars Michael Wong, the star of the first two installments.

Cast
Julian Cheung as Ben Chan
Anthony Wong as Sing
Carmen Lee as Kelly
Monica Chan as Monica Leung
Michael Wong as G4 trainer
Ching Fung as Kim Chong Yat
Nancy Lan as Amy
Cheung Hung On as Chi
Farini Cheung as Grace
Joseph Cheung as Joe
Michael Tong as Michael
Lee Yue Lung as arm dealer
Roderick Lam as Jim
John Chan as John
Andrew Chan as G4 team leader
Leitao Mario De Meio as G4 team leader
Roger Woo as G4 assistant trainer
Rocks Chik as G4 member
Vincent Chik as G4 member
Ho Siu Hang as G4 member
Michael Lam as SB member
Eddie Che as SB/G4 member Yan
Luk Man Wai as SB/G4 member
Dick Tung as furniture mover
Gary Mak as Lung
Paul Cheng as model shop boss
Wong Kin as Photographer Kin
Jimmy Shin as Korean Hitman
Lawrence Cheng
Vincent Kok

Box office
This film grossed HK$6,373,420 during its theatrical run from 27 November to 22 December 1997 in Hong Kong.

External links

G4 Option Zero at Hong Kong Cinemagic

1997 films
1990s action films
1990s Cantonese-language films
Films directed by Dante Lam
Films scored by Shigeru Umebayashi
Films set in Hong Kong
Hong Kong action thriller films
Media Asia films
Police detective films
1997 directorial debut films
1990s Hong Kong films